Frankie Goes to Hollywood were a British band who released two studio albums and seven singles before disbanding in 1987. Since then, almost all of their tracks have been rereleased on compact disc, including various compilation albums and CD singles. In recent years, their record company has also released original material that wasn't released during the band's heyday.

In 1983, they released their debut single, "Relax", which was highly controversial, due to its sexually explicit lyrics and highly suggestive music video. The video, which was shot in a gay nightclub, was banned by the BBC and MTV. After an extremely slow climb, including one week where the song actually went down the chart, Relax eventually topped the UK Singles Chart for five weeks, and it still stands today as one of the best-selling UK singles ever. It also gained success in the United States, where it peaked at number 10 on the Billboard Hot 100. The band's debut album, Welcome to the Pleasuredome, was released in October 1984 and reached the top of the UK Albums Chart. Three more singles were released from the album: "Two Tribes", "The Power of Love" and "Welcome to the Pleasuredome". "Two Tribes" and "The Power of Love" both reached number one on the UK Singles Chart, while "Welcome to the Pleasuredome" peaked at number 2.

Frankie Goes to Hollywood's second and final studio album, Liverpool, was released in 1986. It failed to achieve the same success as its predecessor, with only one of its three singles reaching the top 10 of the UK chart. The album peaked at number 5 on the UK Albums Chart, and was certified Gold by the British Phonographic Industry, whereas Welcome to the Pleasuredome was certified triple platinum.

To coincide with the release of Bang!... The Greatest Hits of Frankie Goes to Hollywood, the tracks "Welcome to the Pleasuredome" (1993) and "Two Tribes" (1994) were re-released in the UK as singles in remixed form.  The tracks "Relax" (1994) and "The Power of Love" (1993) were also re-released, but this time in their original form (the CD singles both featured at least one of the original 1984 12 inch remixes).

To coincide with the release of Maximum Joy in 2000, new remixes of "The Power of Love", "Two Tribes", and "Welcome to the Pleasuredome" all entered the UK charts.

In 1986 a medley "Propaganda For Frankie" (P4F) was released by the German ZYX record label, mixing a re-recording of FGTH "Relax" with Propaganda's "p:Machinery".

Albums

Studio albums

Compilation albums

Singles

Re-issued singles

Promotional singles
 2013: "Maximum Joy"

Videography

Video albums

Music videos

References

External links
 Frankie Goes to Hollywood at AllMusic
 Frankie Goes to Hollywood at Discogs
 Frankie Goes to Hollywood at Rate Your Music

Discographies of British artists
Pop music group discographies
New wave discographies